The 2016–17 UCI Track Cycling World Cup was a multi-race series over a track cycling season. It was the 25th edition of the UCI Track Cycling World Cup organised by the UCI. The series ran from 4 November 2016 to 26 February 2017 and consisted of four rounds.

Series 
This World Cup season consisted of four rounds, in Glasgow (United Kingdom), Apeldoorn (the Netherlands), Cali (Colombia) and Los Angeles (United States).

Glasgow, Great Britain 
The first round was hosted in Glasgow. The racing was held on three full days between 4 and 6 November 2016 at the Sir Chris Hoy Velodrome. Glasgow returned to the calendar for the first time since 2013. The venue will host the UEC European Track Cycling Championships in 2018.

Apeldoorn, The Netherlands 
The second round was hosted in Apeldoorn in the Gelderland province of the Netherlands. This round was held between 11 and 13 November 2016 at Omnisport Apeldoorn.
Apeldoorn has previously hosted the 2011 and 2013 UEC European Track Cycling Championships and also previously hosted the 2011 UCI Track Cycling World Championships.

Cali, Colombia 
The third round will be hosted in Cali. Cali is the third most populated city in Colombia and a regular site for the World Cup series, with this year's meeting being the fourteenth time the city has hosted a World Cup round. The racing will be held on three full days between 17 and 19 February 2017 at the Velódromo Alcides Nieto Patiño. The venue recently hosted the UCI Track Cycling World Championships in 2014.

Los Angeles, United States 
The last round of this World Cup season will be hosted in Los Angeles. This round will be held between 25 and 26 February 2017 at the VELO Sports Center. Los Angeles returns to the World Cup calendar for the first time since 2008.

Standings

Men

Sprint

Team Sprint

Team Pursuit

Pursuit

Madison

Omnium

Keirin

Scratch Race

Points Race

1Km Time Trial

Women

Sprint

Team Sprint

Team Pursuit

500m Time Trial

Madison

Omnium

Keirin

Scratch Race

Points Race

Pursuit

Overall team standings 
Overall team standings are calculated based on total number of points gained by the team's riders in each event.

Results

Men

Women

Note 
Designated a Class 1 event by the UCI, from which fewer ranking points are available. Medals are awarded in full World Cup events only.

Medal table

References 

World Cup
World Cup
UCI Track Cycling World Cup
2016 in British sport
2016 in Dutch sport
2017 in Colombian sport
2017 in American sports